Description of Africa was taken largely from the firsthand geographical work Cosmographia et geographia de Affrica completed by Leo Africanus in 1526 and published under the title Della descrittione dell’Africa et delle cose notabili che ivi sono by Giovanni Battista Ramusio in his collection of travellers' accounts Delle navigationi e viaggi in Venice in 1550. It contained the first detailed descriptions published in Europe of the Barbary Coast (modern Morocco, Algeria, and Tunisia) and the gold-trading kingdoms of west-central Africa. The book was dictated in Italian by Leo Africanus, the famed Moorish traveler and merchant who had been captured by pirates and sold as a slave. Presented, along with his book, to Pope Leo X, he was baptized and freed. Leo, whose name he took in baptism, suggested that he recast his Arabic work in Italian; it was completed in 1526. It was republished repeatedly by Ramusio in his Delle navigationi e viaggi, translated into French and into Latin for the erudite, both in 1556.

The Descrittione is in nine books, an introductory book and an appendix on rivers and fauna and flora, with seven books between, each describing a kingdom: the kingdoms of Marrakesh, Fez, Tlemcen and Tunis, and the regions of Numidia, the sub-Saharan regions, and Egypt. The work circulated in manuscript form for decades. It was in Ramusio's manuscript that Pietro Bembo read it and was astonished: "I cannot imagine how a man could have so much detailed information about these things", he wrote to a correspondent, 2 April 1545.

The book's importance stemmed from its accuracy at a time when the area was little known to Europeans, and its publication at precisely the moment when Latin Christian power was on a collision course with the Ottoman Empire in the Mediterranean and Eastern Europe, while at the same time Western Africa was becoming more accessible to Europeans.

The book was an enormous success in Europe, and was translated into many other languages, remaining a definitive reference work for decades (and to some degree, centuries) afterwards. In English it was served by John Pory, whose translation appeared in 1600 under the title A Geographical Historie of Africa, Written in Arabicke and Italian by Iohn Leo a More... in which form Shakespeare may have seen it and reworked hints in creating the title character of his Othello (ca. 1603).

A twentieth-century rediscovery of the originally-dictated manuscript revealed that Ramusio, in smoothing the grammar of Leo Africanus's text had coloured many neutral details, to make it more palatable to Christian European audiences; French and English translators added further embellishments. Modern translations which incorporate this manuscript are thus more true to the original.

Editions

 The first translation into English.
  Scans from the Internet Archive: Volume 1 (pages 1-224); Volume 2 (pages 225-698); Volume 3 (pages 699- ); Index.
 Scholarly translation into French with extensive notes.

References

Further reading

 Contain a translation into English of Leo Africanus's descriptions of the Middle Niger, Hausaland and Bornu. Corresponds to Épaulard 1956 Vol II pages 463–481.

 Scholarly translation into French with extensive notes.

Geography of Africa
History of Africa
Travel autobiographies
Books about Africa
Berber history